Penny River (also known as Schrader No Name River) is a waterway on the Seward Peninsula in the U.S. state of Alaska. There are several creek tributaries including Willow, Snowshoe and Homestake, from the west; and Quartz and Negsue from the east. Penny River enters Bering Sea a little east of the mouth of Cripple River, and has a drainage area of

See also
List of rivers of Alaska

References

Rivers of the Seward Peninsula
Rivers of Alaska
Rivers of Nome Census Area, Alaska
Rivers of Unorganized Borough, Alaska